Tabernaemontana retusa is a species of plant in the family Apocynaceae. It is found in Madagascar.

References

retusa